Thirumullaivoyal railway station is one of the railway stations on the Chennai Central–Arakkonam section of the Chennai Suburban Railway Network. It serves the neighbourhoods of moondru nagar, Jayalakshmi Nagar, Senthil Nagar and Thirumullaivoyal and a suburb of Chennai located 17 km west of the city centre. It is situated at Senthil Nagar near Ambattur and has an elevation of 21.73 m above sea level.

History

The first lines in the station were electrified on 29 November 1979, with the electrification of the Chennai Central–Tiruvallur section. Additional lines at the station were electrified on 2 October 1986, with the electrification of the Villivakkam–Avadi section.

Layout

The station is the newest one in the Chennai Central-Arakkonam section. There are four tracks—two serving exclusively for the suburban trains. The suburban tracks are served by an island platform, on which the station building is situated. A footbridge connects the platform with the neighbourhood.

See also
 Chennai Suburban Railway
 Railway stations in Chennai

References

External links

 Thirumullaivoyal station at Indiarailinfo.com

Stations of Chennai Suburban Railway
Railway stations in Chennai
Railway stations in Tiruvallur district